Jalu Municipality was one of the municipalities (baladiyah) of Libya from 1983 to 1987.  It lay in the northeastern part of the country.   Its capital was Jalu.  From 2001 to 2007 the area was part of Ajdabiya District. As of 2007 it was subsumed within the enlarged Al Wahat District.

Towns and villages 1983-1987
The settlements in Jalu Municipality were: Al Hiri, Labba, Mawahi, Shurraf, Jalu, Jikharra, Masliwa, and Rashida

Notes

Municipalities of Libya (1983–1995)